The International School (TIS) is a private, co-educational day school located in the Clifton locality of Karachi, Pakistan.

Catering to pupils from the pre-school to high school level, it offers the International Baccalaureate (IB) PYP, MYP and DP.

As of July 2019, the PYP, MYP and DP Coordinators at TIS are Henna Ahmed and Nayma Hasan. The Principal of the School is Samia Majid.

History
The International School was established by Taimur Mirza in 1996, being the first IB-affiliated educational institution to open in Pakistan.

Subjects offered

As of 2019, The International School offers the following subjects:

MYP

MYP 1 to 3
 English 
 Urdu
 French
 Humanities 
 General Science
 Mathematics
 Visual Arts
 Physical Education
 Arabic

MYP 4 and 5
 English 
 Urdu
 French
 History
 Geography
 Integrated Humanities
 Biology
 Chemistry
 Physics
 Arabic
 Mathematics 
 Visual Arts 
 Physical Education
 Inter-disciplinary Project

Only foreign national students may take French or Arabic instead of Urdu, which is compulsory for Pakistani students until MYP 5. Pakistani national students are permitted to take a foreign language course instead of Urdu in DP.

Pakistani national students in MYP 3, 4 and 5 are also required to take Pakistan Studies, while Pakistani Muslim students are also additionally required to take Islamiat/Islamic Studies.

All MYP 4 and 5 students also have the mandatory Personal Project and Creativity, Activity, Service (CAS) requirement.

DP
 English (SL/HL)
 Urdu (SL/HL)
 French (SL only)
 Arabic (SL only)
 Spanish (SL only)
 Biology (SL/HL)
 Chemistry (SL/HL)
 Physics (SL/HL)
 Mathematics (SL/HL/Studies)
 Business and Management (SL/HL)
 Economics (SL/HL)
 Global Politics (SL/HL)
 Visual Arts (SL/HL)

All DP students also have the compulsory Theory of Knowledge, Extended Essay and CAS requirement.

Sports day

The school has an annual sports day, with students divided into three teams in accordance to their houses; Africa, Asia and Europe, with Black, dark green and dark blue being the colours of the teams respectively.

Certifications
Besides for being accredited by the International Baccalaureate as an official IB school, it also is accredited by the Department of Education and Literacy of the provincial Government of Sindh, and is certified with Cambridge International Examinations and Edexcel, and part of the Association of IB World Schools in Pakistan (IBPAK)

References

External links

 The International School, Karachi
 The International School, Karachi page at the International Baccalaureate website

Educational institutions established in 1996
Cambridge schools in Pakistan
International Baccalaureate schools in Pakistan
Schools in Karachi
International schools in Karachi
1996 establishments in Pakistan